Groveland-Big Oak Flat is an unincorporated community and former census-designated place (CDP) in Tuolumne County, California, United States. The population was 3,388 at the 2000 census. This CDP included the communities of Groveland, Big Oak Flat and Pine Mountain Lake (PML).

The CDP was abolished prior to the 2010 census, and Groveland and Pine Mountain Lake were made into separate CDPs.

The town hosts an annual 49er Festival on the 3rd Saturday of September, hosted by the Yosemite Chamber of Commerce, . Groveland is the location of the Groveland Ranger District office of the Stanislaus National Forest. The Groveland Community Services District provides services, including fire protection, to the community . The Department of Forestry and Fire Protection, Tuolumne-Calaveras Ranger Unit, Battalion 16, has a Forest Fire Station west of Groveland on State Route 120.

Geography and climate
Elevation is 867 m (2,846 ft).

Groveland has cold, wet winters and very warm, mostly dry summers.  Average January temperatures are a maximum of 57.5 °F and a minimum of 30.2 °F.  Average July temperatures are a maximum of 90.8 °F and a minimum of 54.2 °F.  There are an average of 32.4 days with highs of 90 °F (32 °C) or higher and an average of 81.6 days with lows of 32 °F (0 °C) or lower.  The highest recorded temperature was 103 °F on July 26, 1980, and the lowest recorded temperature was -2 °F on January 30, 1916.

Annual precipitation averages 37.28 inches.  There are an average of 58 days with measurable precipitation.  The wettest year was 1982 with 66.95 inches and the dryest year was 1976 with 12.27 inches.  The most precipitation in one month was 30.76 inches in January 1911.  The most precipitation in 24 hours was 8.26 inches on January 27, 1914.  Average annual snowfall is 15.3 inches.  The snowiest year was 1967 with 65.0 inches.  The most snow in one month was 42.0 inches in April 1967.

Demographics
As of the census of 2000, there were 3,388 people, 1,533 households, and 1,100 families residing in the CDP. The racial makeup of the CDP was 92.62% White, 0.65% African American, 1.59% Native American, 0.71% Asian, 0.09% Pacific Islander, 1.06% from other races, and 3.28% from two or more races. Hispanic or Latino of any race were 4.93% of the population.

There were 1,533 households, out of which 18.2% had children under the age of 18 living with them, 62.9% were married couples living together, 6.4% had a female householder with no husband present, and 28.2% were non-families. 22.4% of all households were made up of individuals, and 10.4% had someone living alone who was 65 years of age or older.  The average household size was 2.21 and the average family size was 2.55.

In the CDP, the population was spread out, with 17.4% under the age of 18, 3.3% from 18 to 24, 16.5% from 25 to 44, 34.0% from 45 to 64, and 28.8% who were 65 years of age or older.  The median age was 54 years. For every 100 females, there were 92.9 males.  For every 100 females age 18 and over, there were 93.5 males.

The median income for a household in the CDP was $41,928, and the median income for a family was $48,386. Males had a median income of $39,861 versus $21,161 for females. The per capita income for the CDP was $27,394.  About 2.6% of families and 7.0% of the population were below the poverty line, including 9.3% of those under age 18 and 2.0% of those age 65 or over.

See also
California Historical Landmarks in Tuolumne County, California

References

Bibliography
 Map: "Stanislaus National Forest, California," U.S. Forest Service, 1979.
 Browning, Peter, "Place Names of the Sierra Nevada," (Berkeley, California: Wilderness Press, 1991).
 Hotel & Cafe Charlotte (Groveland, CA)

External links
 myMotherLode.com Community Guide
 Groveland Weekly Your source to all things Groveland

Unincorporated communities in Tuolumne County, California
California Historical Landmarks
Populated places in the Sierra Nevada (United States)
Former census-designated places in California
History of the Sierra Nevada (United States)
Unincorporated communities in California